The Little Ogeechee River in Chatham County is one of two rivers by that name in the U.S. state of Georgia. Rising in southern Effingham County, the Little Ogeechee flows to the southeast and enters Chatham County, where it becomes tidal in the vicinity of its crossing by U.S. Route 17. From that point, the river flows through salt marshes and widens considerably, crossing under Georgia State Route 204 west of the Windsor Forest section of Savannah, and ending at Ossabaw Sound just north of the mouth of the Ogeechee River.

See also
List of rivers of Georgia

References 

USGS Hydrologic Unit Map - State of Georgia (1974)

Rivers of Georgia (U.S. state)
Rivers of Chatham County, Georgia
Rivers of Effingham County, Georgia